Biblis (Byblis) is an opera by the French composer Louis Lacoste, first performed at the Académie Royale de Musique (the Paris Opera) on 6 November 1732. It takes the form of a tragédie en musique in a prologue and five acts. The libretto, by de Fleury, is based on the myth of Byblis in Ovid's Metamorphoses.

Sources
 Félix Clément and Pierre Larousse Dictionnaire des Opéras, Paris, 1881, page 110. 

French-language operas
Tragédies en musique
Operas by Louis Lacoste
Operas
1732 operas
Operas based on Metamorphoses